Golam Faruk Prince is a Bangladesh Awami League politician and the Parliament Member of Jatiya Sangsad from Pabna-5.

Early life
Prince was born on 14 January 1969. He has a M.S.S. and an LL.B. degree.

Career
Prince was elected to Parliament from Pabna-5 in 2008 and reelected on 5 January 2014 as a Bangladesh Awami League candidate. In 2009, he accused Rapid Action Battalion of taking over a sports stadium in Pabna and establishing a torture cell inside it. In November 2010 after Bangladesh Chhatra League activists broke into Pabna Government High School and stole entrance examination papers for government employees. The activists also damaged government vehicles and harassed the District Commissioner AFM Monjur Kadir. Prince blamed the DC and said the DC was not a "good person and does not work for me or the party". His comments were criticized by The Daily Star for not understanding how government works.

Prince is a member of the Parliamentary Standing Committee on the Ministry for Foreign Affairs. In 2018, he was nominated by Bangladesh Awami League to contest the 11th parliamentary election.

References

External links
 Parliament.gov.bd
 Amarmp
 Golam Faruk Prince

Awami League politicians
Living people
1969 births
9th Jatiya Sangsad members
10th Jatiya Sangsad members
11th Jatiya Sangsad members